The Salt mine of Imón (Spanish: Salinas de Imón) is a salt mine located in Sigüenza, Spain. It was declared Bien de Interés Cultural in 1992.

References 

Bien de Interés Cultural landmarks in the Province of Guadalajara
Salt mines in Spain
Sigüenza